Juan Manuel Bellón López (born 8 May 1950) is a Spanish and Swedish (since 2017) chess player who holds the FIDE title of Grandmaster (1978). He is a five-time Spanish Chess Champion (1969, 1971, 1974, 1977, 1982), Chess Olympiad individual silver medal winner (1978), and European Team Chess Championship (1989) individual bronze medal winner.

Biography
From the late 1960s to the mid-1990s, Bellón López was one of the top Spanish chess players. In 1969, 1971, 1974, 1977 and 1982 he won Spanish Chess Championship five times. Juan Manuel Bellón López has participated in international chess tournaments many times, achieving successes including first place or shared first place in: Stockholm Rilton Cup (1986/87), Barcelona (1988), Terrassa (1990), Castell-Platja d'Aro (1994), Santa Clara (1999), Varadero (2000).

Bellón López played for Spain in the Chess Olympiads:
 In 1970, at second reserve board in the 19th Chess Olympiad in Siegen (+4, =1, -4),
 In 1972, at first reserve board in the 20th Chess Olympiad in Skopje (+7, =3, -3),
 In 1974, at fourth board in the 21st Chess Olympiad in Nice (+7, =8, -3),
 In 1976, at second board in the 22nd Chess Olympiad in Haifa (+6, =1, -4),
 In 1978, at fourth board in the 23rd Chess Olympiad in Buenos Aires (+8, =4, -1) and won individual silver medal,
 In 1980, at second board in the 24th Chess Olympiad in La Valletta (+6, =3, -4),
 In 1982, at second board in the 25th Chess Olympiad in Lucerne (+3, =3, -4),
 In 1984, at second board in the 26th Chess Olympiad in Thessaloniki (+1, =4, -5),
 In 1986, at third board in the 27th Chess Olympiad in Dubai (+2, =2, -2),
 In 1988, at fourth board in the 28th Chess Olympiad in Thessaloniki (+2, =1, -4),
 In 1992, at third board in the 30th Chess Olympiad in Manila (+4, =3, -4).

Bellón López played for Spain in the European Team Chess Championships:
 In 1970, at fifth board in the 4th European Team Chess Championship in Kapfenberg (+0, =1, -5),
 In 1989, at second board in the 9th European Team Chess Championship in Haifa (+4, =3, -1) and won individual bronze medal.

Also Bellón López three times participated in Clare Benedict Chess Cup (1970, 1974–1977) and in team competition won gold (1970) medal.

In 1974, he was awarded the FIDE International Master (IM) title and received the FIDE Grandmaster (GM) title four years later. Bellón López is also a FIDE Developmental Instructor (2014).

Personal life
His wife is Swedish chess FIDE Grandmaster Pia Cramling, and their daughter Anna Cramling Bellón (born 2002) also plays chess and has a chess youtube channel.

References

External links
 
 
 

1950 births
Living people
Sportspeople from Valencia
Spanish chess players
Swedish chess players
Spanish emigrants to Sweden
Chess grandmasters
Chess Olympiad competitors